President William McKinley High School, more commonly referred to as McKinley High School, is a comprehensive public high school in the Honolulu District of the Hawaii State Department of Education. It serves grades nine through twelve. McKinley is one of three schools in the Kaimuki-McKinley-Roosevelt Complex Area which includes Kaimuki High School and Roosevelt High School. It was founded as Fort Street English Day School in 1865. Later known as Honolulu High School, it was renamed in memorial to William McKinley, the twenty-fifth President of the United States, in 1907. President William McKinley High School is one of the oldest secondary schools in the state and several of its buildings have been listed on the National Register of Historic Places. The campus displays sculptures by Satoru Abe (1926–) and Bumpei Akaji (1921–2002). McKinley High School is accredited by the Western Association of Schools and Colleges.

History
The high school was established in 1865 as the Fort Street English Day School. It was founded by Maurice B. Beckwith. In November 1869, it was moved to Princess Ruth's Palace. In 1895 it was renamed to Honolulu High School. In 1907, it was moved to the corner of Beretania and Victoria Streets and renamed President William McKinley High School, and finally moved to its present campus on King Street in 1923.

On June 5, 1938, the school gave diplomas to 1,288 students, the largest number of diplomas in the history of the school.

Student demographics
School Year 2010-2011
Enrollment - 1782
Number of Economically Disadvantaged Students - 1026 (57.5%)

Racial composition:
Native American - 9 (0.5%)
Black - 12 (0.7%)
Chinese - 449 (25.6%)
Filipino - 347 (19.8%)
Native Hawaiian - 173 (9.9%)
Japanese - 163 (9.3%)
Korean - 110 (6.3%)
Portuguese - 10 (0.6%)
Samoan - 72 (4.1%)
Indo-Chinese - 151 (8.6%)
Micronesian - 98 (5.6%)
Tongan - 13 (0.7%)
Guamanian/Chamorro - 8 (0.5%)
White - 78 (4.5%)
Other Asian - 10 (0.6%)
Other Pacific Islander - 8 (0.5%)
Pacific Islander (2 or more) - 1 (0.1%)
Multiple (2 or more) - 4 (0.2%)

Faculty
School Year 2001-2002
Total number of teachers - 108
Number of teachers with 5 or more years at this school - 85 (78.7%)
Average years of experience - 18.1
Number of teachers with advanced degrees - 32 (29.6%)

School Year 2010-2011
Total number of teachers - 98
Number of teachers with 5 or more years at this school - 69 (70%)
Average years of experience - 17.2
Number of teachers with advanced degrees - 42 (43%)

Complex area information
McKinley High School is part of the Hawaii Department of Education Kaimuki-McKinley-Roosevelt Complex Area along with Kaimuki High School and Roosevelt High School.

McKinley Complex
The McKinley Complex consists of 11 elementary, middle, and public charter schools including McKinley.

Central Middle School
Halau Lokahi Public Charter School
Kaahumanu Elementary School
Kaiulani Elementary School
Kauluwela Elementary School
Lanakila Elementary School
Likelike Elementary School
Lunalilo Elementary School
Myron B. Thompson Academy (Public Charter School)
Royal Elementary School
Voyager Public Charter School

Feeder Middle Schools
McKinley High School feeds primarily from 4 middle schools in the Honolulu area.

Central Middle School
Prince David Kawananakoa Middle School
Robert Louis Stevenson Middle School
President George Washington Middle School

Extracurricular activities

Athletics 
In 2011, McKinley fielded 56 teams competing in 19 sports. These sports including air riflery, baseball, basketball, bowling, canoe paddling, cheerleading, cross country, football, golf, judo, soccer, softball, soft tennis, swimming, tennis, track and field, volleyball, water polo, and wrestling. McKinley competes in the Oahu Interscholastic Association.

McKinley has fielded girls teams in basketball, volleyball, and swimming as early as in the 1910s.  Some years even fielded girls baseball team before softball became recognized as its own sport.  The yearbooks of those early years noted games often against St. Andrew's Priory, YWCA, Palama, Normal School (later merged with University of Hawaii's College of Education), and even College of Hawaii (now known as University of Hawaii). McKinley was a founding member of the Interscholastic League of Honolulu in 1909 alongside Punahou and Kamehameha. In 1970, McKinley left the ILH with 4 other Honolulu area public schools to join the OIA.

The 1933 football team traveled across the Pacific Ocean and went on to defeat Weber College (now known as Weber State University), BYU freshmen team, and Ricks College (now known as BYU-Idaho).  Ricks College traveled to Honolulu the following year.  McKinley won again by the score of 24-6 in a game attended by about 19,000 fans.

Football 
The McKinley Tigers varsity football team competes in the Oahu Interscholastic Association Red-East division. Joseph Cho has served as the team's head coach since 2010.

For the 2010 and 2011 seasons, McKinley's Tiger football team competed in the Oahu Interscholastic Association White Division (Division II) along with 7 other Oahu public schools including rival Kaimuki High School. In 2012, the football team was promoted to the OIA Red-East Division (Division I) where it currently competes with 6 other Oahu public schools. The Tigers' homefield is currently the 3000 seat Ticky Vasconcellos Stadium on the Roosevelt High School campus.

In September 2012, the McKinley football team traveled to Corvallis, Oregon to play the OSAA 4A champions La Salle High School Falcons on the campus of Crescent Valley High School. McKinley won 43-22.

Season records

McKinley Athletic Complex
In September 2008, it was announced that McKinley was planning to upgrade its aging athletic facilities. Expected to cost more than $121 million, the upgrade has 14 elements including a 1,200 stall parking lot, construction of a second gym, renovation of the current gym, construction of a girls softball stadium, construction of a baseball stadium, construction of a 50-meter swimming pool, and construction of a 10,000 seat football stadium.

In 2011, ground was broken on the softball stadium. When completed, the softball stadium will be designated as the OIA softball championship field.

Championships

Noted alumni
Listed alphabetically by last name (year of graduation or years of birth and death)
 Satoru Abe (1926-) – sculptor
 Joseph Kaiponohea ʻAeʻa (1882-1914), hānai son of Queen Liliʻuokalani
Abraham Akaka Minister
 George R. Ariyoshi (1944) - Governor of Hawaii (1974–1986); first American of Japanese descent elected governor in the United States
 Gladys Kamakakuokalani Brandt
 Larry Buenafe (1988) U.S. Marine Corps, Sergeant Major (retired). Awarded by the President, The Legion of Merit, and The Meritorious Service Medal (4th award). Served four combat tours to Iraq and two combat tours to Afghanistan. 
 Tammy Duckworth (1985) - U.S. Army Major, and Iraq War veteran. Democratic member of the U.S. House of Representatives from the eighth district of Illinois.  United States Senator from the State of Illinois
 Hiram L. Fong (1924) - U.S. senator (1959–1977)
 Harry "Fuji" Fujiwara (1949) Former pro wrestler, most popularly known as Mr. Fuji for World Wrestling Entertainment.
 Leina'ala Kalama Heine (1958) – kumu hula
 Yuna Ito (2001) - J-pop singer; In 2007 released debut album, HEART, which debuted at #1 on the Oricon charts in Japan
 Daniel Inouye (1924-2012) - member of U.S. Army's 442nd Regimental Combat Team (known as the "Go For Broke" regiment) which in World War II rescued a Texas Battalion surrounded by German forces in a battle known as the rescue of "The Lost Battalion"; Medal of Honor recipient; U.S. representative (1959–1962); U.S. senator (1962–2012). President pro tempore of the United States Senate, 4th highest-ranking member of the U.S government.
 Dwayne "The Rock" Johnson (1986–1987, freshman and sophomore year only) - Professional, actor
 Duke P. Kahanamoku - Olympic gold medalist in swimming (1912 and 1920)
 Benny Kalama - Musician, falsetto singer
 Keichi Kimura - artist
 Wah Kau Kong (ca. 1937) - first Chinese-American fighter pilot in World War II
 Ford Konno (1952) - won four medals in swimming at the 1952 and 1956 Olympic Games, including 2 gold medals and 2 silver medals, and set an Olympic record in the 1500m free
 Arthur Lyman (1932–2002), jazz vibraphonist
Masaji Marumoto (1906-1995), Hawaii Supreme Court judge
 Fujio Matsuda (1942), educator
 Edith Kawelohea McKinzie (1925–2014), author, genealogist and traditional hula expert
 Leroy A. Mendonca (1932-1951) U.S. Army sergeant killed in combat during Korean War, Medal of Honor
Johnny Naumu (19191982), American football player
 Alice Sae Teshima Noda (1894-1964) - entrepreneur
 Frederick Pang (1954), U.S. Assistant Secretary of the Navy (Manpower and Reserve Affairs), 1993–94
 Paul Schrier (1985), actor
 Alfred Song (1936), California State Assemblyman and State Senator
 John Chin Young (1909–1997), artist

Architecture gallery
The architect most involved in the early layout of the King Street campus and design of its Spanish Colonial Revival buildings was Louis E. Davis. The original quadrangle was placed on the National Register of Historic Places in 1980.

In Popular Culture
Several members of the cast of the ninth part of JoJo's Bizarre Adventure, The JoJoLands attend the High School, including the main protagonist, Jodio Joestar.

References
Hawaii State Department of Education (n.d.). School Status and Improvement Report (School Year 2001-2002): President William McKinley High School. Retrieved June 16, 2004, from State of Hawaii Department of Education, Accountability Resource Center Hawaii Web site: http://arch.k12.hi.us/school/ssir/2002/honolulu.html
Sakamoto, Dean, Vladimir Ossipoff, Karla Britton, Kenneth Frampton, Diana Murphy (2008). Hawaiian Modern: The Architecture of Vladimir Ossipoff. New Haven: Yale University Press. , 
U.S. Department of Education, National Center for Education Statistics (n.d.). Common Core of Data (CCD) 2001-2002 School Year: McKinley High School. Retrieved on June 16, 2004, from http://nces.ed.gov/ccd/schoolsearch/school_detail.asp?Search=1&SchoolID=150003000193&ID=150003000193

Notes

External links

McKinley High School (school Web site)
McKinley High School (Hawaii State Department of Education Web site)
McKinley High School Robotics Team
Hawaii State Department of Education
Official Alumni Community Site

School buildings on the National Register of Historic Places in Hawaii
Public high schools in Honolulu
Louis Davis buildings
1865 establishments in Hawaii
Educational institutions established in 1865
National Register of Historic Places in Honolulu